Anatomize is the third album by American Progressive rock band Thanatopsis, released on February 17, 2006.

Track listing

Personnel
Buckethead – guitars
Travis Dickerson – keyboards
Ramy Antoun – drums

References

External links
Anatomize analysis at TDRS Music

2006 albums